HSBC Bank Middle East Limited is the largest and most widely represented international bank in the Middle East.

History

The Imperial Bank of Persia (Persian: بانک شاهنشاهی ایران; Bank-e Šâhanšâhi-ye Irân) was a British bank that operated as the state bank and bank of issue in Iran (formerly known as Persia until 1935) between 1889 and 1929. It was established in 1889 with a concession from the Persian government to Baron Julius De Reuter (born Israel Beer Josaphat), a German Jewish banker and businessman who later became a Christian and a British subject.

The bank was the first modern bank in Iran and introduced European banking ideas to a country in which they were previously unknown. The legal centre of the bank was in London and whilst it was subject to British law, its activities were based in Tehran. It also had operations in other Middle Eastern countries.

In 1952, the bank abandoned the Iranian market and it was later renamed British Bank of the Middle East (BBME).

In 1959, BBME was acquired by The Hongkong and Shanghai Banking Corporation Limited.

In 1994, the bank's head office was moved to Jersey, and subsequently changed its name to HSBC Bank Middle East (HBME) in 1999.

In June 2016, the bank transferred its place of incorporation and head office from Jersey to Dubai International Financial Centre, Dubai, UAE.

Middle East banking

HBME is regulated by the Dubai Financial Services Authority, but remains locally regulated in each of the countries in which it operates by the country's Central Bank and its other regulators.

HSBC maintains a network of offices in various countries in the Middle East. Operations of the group in the Middle East are under this subsidiary.

Algeria  
HSBC has a presence in Algeria since August 2008 when HSBC France opened a registered office and branch in Algiers.

In 2009, HSBC France transferred the supervision of the bank to HBME. The bank has two branches located at the cities of Algiers (head office) and Oran. It offers banking products and services for Corporate, as well as Retail Banking customers.

Bahrain
HSBC has a presence in Bahrain since 1944 when the Imperial Bank Of Persia opened a branch.

The bank's network in Bahrain extends to three locations, including an offshore banking unit. It is represented by HSBC Middle East Limited (HBME) and is the largest foreign bank in Bahrain. The bank has branches, in Manama, Adliya, and Seef, as well as a network of ATMs at 20 different locations.

HSBC provides a range of banking services for both corporate and retail banking customers in Bahrain.

Djibouti
British Bank of the Middle East opened a branch in 1975 that it closed in 1986, having failed to adapt itself to the market.

Egypt
HSBC Bank Egypt was established in 1982 as Hongkong Egyptian Bank with 40% HSBC ownership. In January 1994, the bank was renamed Egyptian British Bank under the same shareholding structure. The bank took the name HSBC Bank Egypt in April 2001 following an increase in shareholding by the HSBC Group's from 40% to 94.5% of its issued share capital.

Israel

HSBC started operations in Israel with a full banking license since 2001, headquartered at Ramat Gan. HSBC in Palestine currently offers Commercial banking and Private banking through HSBC Private Bank in Switzerland.

Jordan
British Bank of the Middle East had established itself in Jordan in 1949. At one point it had a branch in Jordanian Jerusalem, before the Israeli occupation of east Jerusalem after the war of 1967.

In 2013, HSBC Jordan's banking business consisted of four branches with gross assets of approximately $1.2 billion.

On 19 June 2014, Arab Jordan Investment Bank (AJIB) acquired HSBC Jordan. Almost all employees were expected to transfer to AJIB.

Kuwait
HSBC first received the license to operate in Kuwait as the Imperial Bank of Persia in 1942, it renamed itself to BBME in 1952. It left the country in 1971 following the nationalisation of all foreign bank operations.

The bank formally reestablished a presence in Kuwait in October 2005 after receiving a license by Kuwait's Council Of Ministers.

The bank has a branch located in AlHamra Tower, in Kuwait City, offering Corporate banking, Investment banking, Private banking and Treasury services.

Lebanon
HSBC has been operating in Lebanon since 1946. It maintained a network of four offices in St. Georges Bay, Dora, Achrafieh and Ras Beirut which is supported by telephone and internet banking services. On 16 November 2016, HSBC announced the sell of its Corporate, Retail Banking and Wealth Management business to BLOM Bank. The sale was completed on 13 June 2017. All employees were transferred to BLOM Bank S.A.L. as part of the agreement.

Oman
HSBC Bank Oman S.A.O.G has been present in the Sultanate since 1948, and for two decades it was the only bank operating in the country. The bank assisted in the issuance of the first Omani currency in 1970. It provides a wide range of banking services for both corporate and retail banking customers. In recent years HSBC Oman has expanded to over 90 branches and in addition has a full-service trading operation, private banking operation, and a custodial service for the Muscat Securities Market. In 2012, HSBC merged with Oman International Bank and by the end of 2012 all OIB branches had been rebranded as HSBC Bank Oman S.A.O.G.

The bank has several dedicated 'Premier' Customer Service Centres in Madinat al Sultan Qaboos and Azaiba, in addition to dedicated service areas in certain main branches such as Qurum and Ruwi.

HSBC Bank Oman board members:

 Sir Sherard Cowper-Coles (Chairman) 
 Waleed Omar Al Zawawi (Deputy Chairman)
 Dr. Juma Ali Juma Al Juma (Senior Independent Director)
 Aimen Ahmed Sultan Al Hosni
 Paul Joseph Lawrence
 Christine Jane Lynch
 Abdulfattah Sharaf

Pakistan
HSBC started its operations in Pakistan in 1982 with limited presence in three major cities. HSBC's offices in Pakistan were operated by The Hongkong and Shanghai Banking Corporation initially. In 2008, The Hongkong and Shanghai Banking Corporation merged its Pakistan banking business with HSBC Bank Middle East Limited. Over the course of next 4 year, it expanded its operations to all major cities of Pakistan and operated as a full-service bank. At its peak, it had 12 offices, 24/7 telephone call centre, and HSBC Premier. The bank also offered NRP (Non-Resident Pakistani) services. Out of its branches, four were located in Karachi, two each in Lahore and Islamabad, and one each in Rawalpindi, Faisalabad, Sialkot and Multan. All the cities served also offered Premier Centres.

On 9 May 2014, HSBC Bank Middle East (HBME) entered into an agreement to sell its banking business in Pakistan to Meezan Bank, citing strategy of scaling back its operations in markets with limited scale. The transaction, after regulatory and other customary approvals, completed on 14 October 2014. All employees in the business were offered positions with Meezan upon completion.

Palestinian Territories

HSBC operated in the Palestinian Territories until 31 December 2015. All operations of HSBC, including personal and commercial banking and headquarters in Ramallah, were closed by 31 December 2015.

Qatar
HSBC has been present in Qatar since 1954. The bank offers a full range of cross-border banking products and services including Retail Banking, Commercial and Global Banking, Wealth Management and Offshore banking. HSBC is the largest foreign bank in Qatar and has three branches in Doha, located at Airport Road, City Center and Salwa, as well as a network of ATMs at 11 locations.

United Arab Emirates

The United Arab Emirates represents a key part of HSBC's business, with 24 branches and offices. It is also the location of HSBC's regional head office.

Board of directors (as of 2020)
 David G Eldon (Chairman)
 Martin Tricaud (Deputy Chairman)
 Muna Easa Al Gurg
 Amina Alrustamani
 David Dew
 John Raine
 Neslihan Erkazanci
 John Barlett
 Christopher Spooner
 Stephen Moss

On 22 February 2021, the HSBC Group announced a change to its senior management team in the Middle East, North Africa and Turkey
region.

See also

The Saudi British Bank
HSBC
 Imperial Bank of Persia

References

Sources
Alwan, Daoud Aboubakern, and Yohanis Mibrathu (2000) Historical Dictionary of Djibouti. (Scarecrow Press).

External links
HSBC Bank Middle East Limited website
HSBC Israel Website

Banks of Bahrain
Banks of Israel
Banks of Jordan
Banks of Kuwait
Banks of Lebanon
Banks of Oman
Banks of Qatar
Banks of Pakistan
Banks of the State of Palestine
Banks of the United Arab Emirates
Middle East
Banks established in 1889
Companies of Jersey
2001 establishments in Israel
1954 establishments in Qatar
1946 establishments in Lebanon
Kuwaiti companies established in 2005
Israeli companies established in 2001